Grm or GRM may refer to:

Business 
 Gross Rent Multiplier, a real estate concept
 Palladium International (formerly GRM International), a consulting and management company

European villages 
 Grm (Zenica), Bosnia and Herzegovina
 Grm pri Podzemlju, Metlika, southeastern Slovenia
 Grm, Ivančna Gorica, central Slovenia
 Grm, Trebnje, eastern Slovenia
 Grm, Velike Lašče, central Slovenia

Sport 
 Daša Grm (born 1991), Slovenian figure skater
 Garry Rogers Motorsport, an Australian V8 Supercar racing team
 Grassroots Motorsports, a racing magazine

Other uses 
 Groupe de Recherches Musicales, a French concrete music collective
 GRM, a class of genes coding for the metabotropic glutamate receptor